Kreishauptmannschaft is a German historical term that may refer to a historical type of administrative division in Germany, especially in the Kingdom of Saxony.

Translated literally, it would mean something like District Captaincy. Regierungsbezirk is the word for such administrative division in modern Germany.

Kreishauptmannschaft in the Kingdom of Saxony
Originally there were four  in the Kingdom of Saxony:
 Kreishauptmannschaft Bautzen
 Kreishauptmannschaft Dresden
 Kreishauptmannschaft Leipzig
 Kreishauptmannschaft Zwickau
In 1900, a fifth was added: 
 Kreishauptmannschaft Chemnitz

References

 
Former subdivisions of Germany